The Blue and Gold Wagon Wheel, now known simply as the Wagon Wheel, is awarded to the winner of the annual college football game between the Zips of the University of Akron and the Golden Flashes of Kent State University. The trophy is, as the name implies, the wheel from a horse-drawn wagon that is painted blue and gold, the school colors for both universities. It was first contested in 1946 when the rivalry resumed after World War II. 

The rivalry was contested annually over several periods of time, but none lasted longer than nine consecutive years prior to the current run. Akron joined the Mid-American Conference in 1992, and since then, the rivalry has been played every year. Through the 2022 game, Kent State leads the Wagon Wheel series 27–24–1. Akron leads the overall series 35–28–2.

History
The two schools did not meet again until 1928 and played annually from 1928 through the 1936 game. From 1932–1935, both teams were members of the Ohio Athletic Conference, which Akron had joined in 1915 and Kent had joined in 1932. During that time period, all of the games were Akron wins except a scoreless tie in 1932. After Akron left the OAC in 1936, the series was interrupted again after the 1936 meeting and resumed in 1940 with Akron wins in 1940 and 1941 before Kent State recorded their first win in the series with a 23–6 win in 1942. World War II halted the series again as neither school fielded a team for the 1943, 1944, and 1945 seasons.

Akron rejoined the OAC in 1944 and the Wagon Wheel trophy was introduced when the series resumed in 1946. It was the idea of Raymond Manchester, the dean of men at Kent State. Manchester donated the wheel, claiming it had been discovered in Kent in 1902 during construction of a pipeline or building near the eventual site of Kent State University. He connected the wheel to both schools by creating a legend that the wheel had been part of the carriage of Akron industrialist John R. Buchtel, the main benefactor and original namesake of what is now the University of Akron (known as Buchtel College from 1872–1913). Manchester's story was that Buchtel had been near the future site of Kent State in 1870 while scouting for a site to locate a new college. Buchtel's carriage became stuck in the mud and his horses pulled it apart, with one of the wheels becoming embedded in the mud. That incident, Manchester claimed, caused Buchtel to ultimately choose Akron as the site of the new college, which opened in 1872 and eventually became the University of Akron. 

While Akron went 10–0–1 in the rivalry's beginning, Kent State proceeded to win the next 10 games, including the first 9 of the Wagon Wheel series. Several of the wins were by large margins, including a 47–0 win in 1949 that stands as the largest margin of victory for either team. Prior to Kent State's 58–18 win in 1954, Akron announced the series was being discontinued as being noncompetitive.

In the 1970s, the rivalry was revived, but the teams only met occasionally as they played in different conferences and different NCAA levels. The first meeting was in 1972, which resulted in a 13–13 tie, and they met again two years later in 1974. Kent State's 51–14 win in the 1974 game capped a stretch where the Golden Flashes went 11–0–1 against the Zips and tied the overall series. Akron finally recorded their first Wagon Wheel win five years later with a 15–13 win at the Rubber Bowl and the Zips' first win over KSU since 1941. The two teams next played in 1981 and again from 1983–1990. 1991 was the last interruption in the rivalry before Akron began MAC competition the following year. Since 1992, the game has been played every year.

Beginning with the 1997 meeting, the Zips won six in a row and 11 of 13. Kent State's only wins in that span came in 2003 with a 41–38 victory at the Rubber Bowl led by Joshua Cribbs, and a 37–15 win at Dix Stadium in 2006. The 2009 game in Akron, the teams' first meeting at InfoCision Stadium – Summa Field, resulted in a 28–20 Akron win, which tied the Wagon Wheel series at 19 wins each. Since then, the series remained tied through 2019.

Conference affiliations
Since 1992, both Kent State and Akron have been members of the Mid-American Conference, and when the MAC divided into divisions in 1997, both schools were placed in the East Division. From 1932–1935 and 1944–1950, both schools were members of the Ohio Athletic Conference. Akron joined the OAC in 1915 but left in 1936 only to rejoin in 1944. Kent State joined the OAC in 1932 and remained a member until joining the MAC in 1951. 

In 1956, the NCAA divided its membership into two divisions: the University Division for larger schools and the College Division for smaller schools. Kent State, with other MAC schools, played in the University Division, which became Division I in 1974 and Division I-A in 1978. Akron and the OAC played in the College Division, which eventually became Divisions II and III. After leaving the OAC in 1966, the Zips played as an independent. When the NCAA changed the divisions again to create three, the Zips played one season, 1973, in Division III before moving to Division II in 1974, where they continued to compete as an independent until joining the Mid-Continent Conference for the 1978 and 1979 seasons. The following year, 1980, Akron moved to Division I-AA, and began play in the Ohio Valley Conference.  In 1987, the Zips left the OVC in football and transitioned to Division I-A, becoming the first team to do so since Division I had been divided. From 1987 through the 1991 season, the Zips were again independent in football until they joined the MAC for the 1992 season.

Game results

Wagon Wheel Challenge
In 2011, the two schools began the Wagon Wheel Challenge, which counts all athletic contests in the sports where they compete head-to-head. Initially, the challenge involved 15 sports, but was reduced to 14 from 2015-2019 after Akron eliminated their baseball program. Following the reinstatement of Akron's baseball team and the addition of Women's Lacrosse at Akron in 2019, the challenge grew to 16 sports, but was reduced back to 14 after UA discontinued its men's cross country, men's golf, and women's tennis teams in 2020. From 2011-2015, through a sponsorship agreement with PNC Financial Services it was known as the "PNC Wagon Wheel Challenge". Beginning in 2016, it became sponsored by Crystal Clinic Orthopaedic Center.  Each sport is worth one point, awarded to the winning team. In sports with multiple meetings per season, whichever team wins the most games takes the full point. If the teams split the season's meetings, each school gets a half-point. For sports that only compete against each other as part of the conference championship meet, such as cross country, golf, and track and field, whichever team finishes higher in the championship meet is awarded the point. Games in the respective conference tournaments can also factor in to which school receives the point if the teams split their regular-season meetings, with the conference tournament meeting acting as a deciding game. The first 10 years of the challenge have seen a split between the two schools. Kent State took victory in the first four seasons, followed by Akron in the next five, including the abbreviated 2019–20 season, and Kent State won the 2020–21 season.

References

College football rivalry trophies in the United States
Akron Zips football
Kent State Golden Flashes football
1946 establishments in Ohio